Calapan, officially the City of Calapan, is a 3rd class component city and capital of the province of Oriental Mindoro, Philippines. According to the 2020 census, it has a population of 145,786 people.

The city serves as the gateway to the Oriental Mindoro province with the implementation of the Strong Republic Nautical Highway (SRNH) an integrated ferry project of then President Gloria Macapagal Arroyo that extends further to the southern part of the Philippines. The Calapan City Seaport is the largest and busiest seaport on Mindoro Island, which is just 45 minutes away by ferry boats and roll-on/roll-off (RORO) ships to-and-fro Batangas City International Seaport.

Calapan is one of two cities in the Mimaropa region, the other being Puerto Princesa in Palawan. Calapan serves as the region's administrative center. It is also the center of commerce, industry, transport, communication, religious activities and education in the entire province of Oriental Mindoro.

Etymology
The derivation of the name of Calapan cannot be traced with certainty. Some opined that it came from the word “Kalap” which means to gather logs. Thus “Kalapan” was supposed to be a place where logs were gathered. In the old records, however, there was never a mention of Calapan as a place where logs were produced or exported. Furthermore, huge forest trees where logs were produced certainly did not grow near the town, which was swampy. Another theory holds that Calapan was originally pronounced as “Kalapang” which, according to an old Tagalog dictionary, was a synonym for “sanga” or branch. It could then refer to the settlement of Kalapang as a branch of its mother town of Baco, an adjoining town. The name was later hispanized as Calapan.

History
Calapan was formerly a small village before the establishment of the first Religious District in Baco. The District convent was transferred to Calapan in 1733 and began its jurisdiction over the Northern Mindoro Ecclesiastical Area.

In the early 18th century, the town only occupied a strip of land stretching from Ibaba to Ilaya in a cross-shape facing the present Santo Niño Cathedral and cut off by the river. Later on, succeeding barrios were founded.

In 1837, the capital of the province was moved from Puerto Galera to Calapan. When Mindoro became a part of Marinduque on June 13, 1902, the provincial capital was once again moved to Puerto Galera. On November 10, 1902, Mindoro was detached from Marinduque. In 1903, Calapan once again became the provincial capital.

In 1902, under Act 2824, the three municipalities gained their independence.

In 1919, the boundary dispute between Calapan and Naujan was adjudicated by Presidentes (Mayors) Agustin Quijano of Calapan and Agustin Garong of Naujan over a portion of the territory of what is now known as the present boundary. The portion of agricultural area was awarded to Naujan, thus, making the area of Calapan much smaller as compared to that of Naujan which is now considered as the biggest municipality of the province.

Cityhood

In the year 1998, Calapan was converted from a municipality into a component city by virtue of Republic Act No. 8475. The law was authored in Congress by Rep. Renato V. Leviste and was signed by President Fidel Ramos on February 2, 1998. On March 21, 1998, the people of Calapan ratified the creation of the City of Calapan in a plebiscite marking the same day as the city's foundation day. Incumbent Mayor Arnan C. Panaligan became the last Municipal Mayor and the first City Mayor of Calapan. To date, it is the first and only city in the whole island of Mindoro.

Calapan was reclassified from a 4th class city in 2007 to a 3rd class city in 2010, on account of its innovations in public service, modernization programs, increased revenue collection, and overall economic improvement.

Geography
Calapan is bounded to the north and north-east by the Calapan Bay, south and southeast by Naujan, and to the west by the Baco. The city lies at the quadrangle bounded by 13°12.6 and 13°27’ north latitudes and 121°17’ east longitudes.

The city also has jurisdiction over the Baco Islands and the two Silonay Islets on Calapan Bay.

The overall land characteristic is a wide plain with rivers, interspersed with wetlands at the seacoast periphery.

Barangays
The City of Calapan is divided into 62 barangays, (the smallest local government units) which handles governance in a much smaller area. These barangays are grouped into congressional districts where each district is represented by a congressman in the country's House of Representatives.

Climate
Calapan's climate is described as mild. It is relatively dry from November to April and wet during the rest of the year. February and March have the least rainfall while October and November are the months of greatest rainfall.

Wind direction throughout the year is variable; Northeast monsoons prevail from August, November, December and January to March; East to Northeast on April; Southeast to South on May and June; Northeast to South on July and September, and Easterly on October.

Climate is favorable for vegetation throughout the year under the Type III climate type of the Philippine weather bureau, PAGASA, with relative humidity at 81%.

Demographics
Calapan has a population of 145,786 as of the 2020 census.

Economy

The city's economy is dependent on agriculture and fishing. However, a growing industry in machinery and tourism has contributed well to the city's annual income making it one of the fastest growing new cities in the country for the last 10 years.

Since 1998, the city has experienced rapid development. The establishment of a special development area, particularly an eco-zone for light industries located at the Urban Development Area (Lumangbayan and Guinobatan), has been promoted and now serves as growth area which generates employment and spurs economic opportunities. Such industries focus on agro-industrial based activities such as food processing, handicraft making, furniture making and other related activities.

Calapan plays a major role in the Philippine economy as one of the major food suppliers in the country. The city is also a major exporter of rice supplying to Metro Manila and major parts of Luzon making it both an agriculturally-progressive and urbanized city. The five major crops are rice, citrus, banana, rambutan and lanzones. The top five industries in Calapan are trading, tourism, services, marine and aquatic, and food processing.

Calapan serves as the province's industrial hub. It plays a pivotal role in the economic development of the province and its adjacent areas.

Trade and commerce
Trading and commercial activities are mainly confined in wholesale and retail trade. Other thriving industries are manufacturing, financing, tourism, food and beverages and services. In recent years, the city has witnessed the influx of private investments that increase income and employment opportunities. The City Investment Code encourages new and existing entrepreneurs to increase their investments. All business establishments are also required to employ bonafide residents of the city to at least 70% of the job opportunities that they will generate.

Agriculture
Majority of the vast agricultural lands of Calapan is devoted to rice production. Other crops grown in the area are citrus fruits such as calamansi, banana, lanzones, rambutan, mango, coconut and vegetables.

Transportation

Port of Calapan is the primary seaport serving the city which connected through routes to the Batangas International Port in mainland Luzon. Motorized tricycles are a common mode of transport and jeepneys and vans served as transportation options to other municipalities within Oriental Mindoro which passes through the mostly concreted pronvincial road spanning the province.

The city also has an airport, the Calapan Airport, classified as a secondary airport and is used for general aviation handling mostly small planes and choppers with regular trips from Ninoy Aquino International Airport (NAIA).

Education

Institutions of higher learning
The city is host to numerous higher educational institutions. The Divine Word College of Calapan, a Catholic college run by the Divine Word Missionaries is currently the largest institution of higher learning in the city and the province of Oriental Mindoro. Other private institutions of higher learning include the St. Anthony College Calapan City (Information Technology, Nursing and Tourism), Luna Goco Colleges (Nursing), Southwestern Luzon Maritime Institute Foundation and Filipino Academy of Scientific Trades (Maritime Studies), AMA Computer Learning Center (Information Technology), and CLCC Institute of Computer Arts and Technology (Information Technology).

There are currently two public institutions of higher learning in the city. One is the Mindoro State University (Calapan Campus)  while the other is the City College of Calapan which was opened last June 2008 through the initiative of City Mayor Salvador Leachon.

Basic education
Calapan has nine national high schools (NHS), one of which is the Oriental Mindoro National High School (OMNHS) the main campus of the school and the largest public high school in Oriental Mindoro.  Other public high schools include the Mamerta Gargullo Tolentino Memorial National High School (former Parang NHS), Ceriaco A. Abes Memorial MNHS, Canubing NHS, Managpi NHS, Pedro V. Panaligan MNHS, the Community Vocational High School, the LEMNAHIS Bucayao Annex, and the Nag-iba National High School (former LEMNAHIS Annex Nag-iba).

The Catholic Church also runs the Holy Infant Academy, while DWCC also maintains a Basic Education Department.

Public elementary schools meanwhile are organized into three districts.  They are the Calapan West, Calapan South (Pedro Tolentino Memorial School (PTMS) and Calapan East Districts.

Healthcare
The city is served primarily by the Oriental Mindoro Medical Center which is also the largest hospital in the province. There are also numerous private hospitals in the city such as the Medical Mission Group Hospital and Health Services Cooperative which is the only tertiary level hospital in the region, Maria Estrella General Hospital, Santa Maria Village Hospital, Hospital of the Holy Cross and the Luna-Goco Medical Center.

In addition, the city has public health centers providing free health check-ups and basic medicine supplies to all residents. These public centers are being funded and supported by the City Health and Sanitation Department.

Government

Elected officials

Sister cities
 Valenzuela, Philippines
 Lucena, Quezon, Philippines
 San Jose, Occidental Mindoro, Philippines
 Batangas City, Philippines

Notable personalities

Néstor Vicente Madali González - Internationally acclaimed writer and educator
3rd Lt. Jose Protacio C. Gozar - Pilot officer with the Philippine Army Air Corps who received the Distinguished Service Cross for his gallantry during the air war at the onset of World War II.
Jason Francisco - 3rd Placer, Pinoy Big Brother: Double Up
Karen Reyes -  2nd Big Placer of Pinoy Big Brother: Teen Edition 4
Charo Santos-Concio - President, ABS-CBN Broadcasting Corporation
Col. Pedro A. Serran (USAFFE-AFP)-- Son of Isidro and Maxima Serran, born November 26, 1913, in Calapan. Known as the "Liberator of Zarraga," Iloilo Province during World War II. He died on June 8, 1999, in Colorado, U.S.A., and is buried in Pittsburgh, California. His life-size statue stands on the park named after him in Zarraga. It was inaugurated in 1998.
Joseph Mercado - Vice President, Polytechnic University of the Philippines
Jose Antonio N. Carrion - Governor of Marinduque, 2007 – 2010

References

External links

 [ Philippine Standard Geographic Code]
 

 
Cities in Mimaropa
Populated places in Oriental Mindoro
Provincial capitals of the Philippines
Populated places established in 1733
1733 establishments in the Philippines
Port cities and towns in the Philippines
Component cities in the Philippines